Additional sex combs like 3 (Drosophila) is a protein that in humans is encoded by the ASXL3 gene.

References

Further reading 

 
 

Genes on human chromosome 18